Alexander Hotel may refer to:

 Alexandria Hotel and Annex, Napa, California, listed on the National Register of Historic Places (NRHP)
 Alexander Hotel (St. Petersburg, Florida), NRHP-listed
 Alexander Hotel (Reidsville, Georgia), NRHP-listed